This is a list of Persepolis F.C.'s results at the  2007/2008 Season. The club is competing in the Iran Pro League and Hazfi Cup.

Squad

Iran Pro League

Iran Pro League 2007/08

Persepolis schedule IPL 2007/08
Last updated May 13, 2008

Results by round

Results summary

League standings

Persepolis goalscorers in IPL 2007/08
Last updated May 17, 2008

Hazfi Cup 2007-08

Third Round 
22 November 2007
 Sanat Naft 2-3 Persepolis
Faraz Fatemi 
Abbas Aghaei 
Alireza Vahedi Nikbakht

Fourth Round (1/16 Final - Last 32) 
17 December 2007
 Persepolis 4-1 Petroshimi Tabriz
Hossein Badamaki  
Karim Bagheri 
Alireza Vahedi Nikbakht (2)

Fifth Round (1/8 Final - Last 16) 
24 December 2007
 Pas Hamedan 3-0 Persepolis

Club

Kit 

|
|
|

Club managers

Club officials

Captains 
1.  Karim Bagheri 
2.  Sheys Rezaei 
3.  Pejman Nouri

Squad changes during 2007/08 season

In

Out

References

 Persepolis FC official website
 Persian League
 
 
 Hazfi Cup 2007–08

Persepolis F.C. seasons
Iranian football clubs 2007–08 season